Christof Nel (born 7 April 1944) is a German theatre and opera director. He began his career as an actor but moved on to direct opera productions at major opera houses.

Life 
Born in Stuttgart to parents who were both musicians, Nel studied art history and theatre in Munich. He began directing in the 1970s.

His first plays were produced at the Theater Köln, including the first performance in Germany in 1973 of Occupations (Roter Sonntag in Turin) by Trevor Griffiths. He was successful in productions for the Schauspiel Frankfurt with Peter Palitzsch. Nel collaborated in interdisciplinary and experimental work with Heiner Goebbels and William Forsythe at the  Frankfurt. Several of the plays he directed were invited to the Berliner Theatertreffen, such as the world premiere of Thomas Brasch's Rotter in a Frankfurt production in 1978 and his production of Antigone by Sophocles/Hölderlin in 1979.

Nel also directed at the Staatstheater Stuttgart and Deutsches Schauspielhaus in Berlin. Further stations were Theater Bochum, Theater Basel and the Hamburg State Opera.

Since the 1980s Nel has also staged music theatre, among others at the Oper Frankfurt, where he directed Weber's Der Freischütz, Verdi's Falstaff, Smetana's Die verkaufte Braut, and Wagner's Die Meistersinger von Nürnberg, Tristan und Isolde and Parsifal. There he also directed Salome and Die Frau ohne Schatten by Richard Strauss and the first production in German of Aulis Sallinen's Kullervo in 2011. He directed at the Staatsoper Stuttgart and the Staatsoper Hannover. At the Mannheim National Theatre, he directed Offenbach's Hoffmanns Erzählungen. Nel staged Weber's Der Freischütz at the Komische Oper Berlin.

References

External links 
 
 Christof Nel (articles) Neue Musikzeitung

German theatre directors
German opera directors
1944 births
Living people
People from Stuttgart